St John's Wood Church is a Church of England parish church in St John's Wood, London. The church is located on Lord's Roundabout, between Lord's Cricket Ground and Regent's Park, and has a Grade II* listing. The parish is in the Archdeaconry of Charing Cross, in the deanery of Westminster St Marylebone.

History 

St John's Wood Church started life as a chapel of ease to St Marylebone Parish Church, and was constructed in 1814 by Thomas Hardwick, who was simultaneously constructing the current St Marylebone Church. Although the church originally had extensive burial grounds, these were closed in 1855 and opened as a public garden, St. John's Wood Church Grounds, in 1886. In 1898 the building became a chapel of ease to Christ Church, Marylebone, and increasingly became the centre of administration for the parish.

After bomb damage during the Second World War rendered St Stephen's, Avenue Road unusable, St John's Wood Church became a parish church in its own right in 1952. As well as holding regular services for the community, the church has hosted the wedding of Peggy Cripps to Joe Appiah in June 1953, the blessing of the marriage of Paul and Linda McCartney in 1969, and the funeral of Ursula Vaughan Williams in 2007.

A Church Hall complex was constructed in the 1970s, the completion of which was marked with the erection of a statue of the church's patron, John the Baptist, by Hans Feibusch. Restoration of the church interior took place in 1991 under the supervision of Michael Reardon, when the chancel pavement was relaid in limestone and the present central altar replaced the high altar at the east end of the church.

Present day 

The church has between 130 and 150 regular worshippers, with an electoral roll of 225. Services aim to maintain "a tradition of thoughtful and intelligent preaching and teaching", as well as the church's musical tradition; in addition to a professional octet of singers leading the worship at the main Sunday service, an amateur Chamber Choir made up of members of the congregation sings Evensong once a month. The organ is a three manual, 52 stop instrument by B. C. Shepherd and Sons. The building is also kept open from early morning to late afternoon every day as a place of prayer and stillness.

St John's Wood Church works closely with other local churches, who together hold a monthly service with letter-writing for Amnesty International. Clergy from St John's Wood Church also meet with representatives from the Liberal Jewish Synagogue and London Central Mosque to hold scriptural reasoning discussions.

During term-time the Church Hall complex is occupied by St John's Wood Pre-Preparatory School during the day, while a local youth club operates in the crypt on Monday, Wednesday and Friday evenings. The hall is also occasionally hired out for local residency association meetings, and to charities such as ARC UK.

Incumbents 
Incumbents of St John's Wood Chapel
 Okey Belfour, 1814–18
 Gilbert Parke, 1818–25
 Thomas Wharton, 1825–55
 Henry Sandham, 1855–95
 William Ferrar, 1896–99
 James Beaumont, 1900–15
 Edward Adams, 1915–25
 Brierley Kay, 1925–40
 Oswin Gibbs-Smith, 1941–47
 Noel Perry-Gore, 1947–52

Vicars of St John's Wood Church
 Noel Perry-Gore, 1952–72
 Tim Raphael, 1973–83
 John Slater, 1983–2001
 Anders Bergquist, 2002–present

See also
List of churches in London

References

External links
The church's website
Contact details for the church
The Church's Facebook page

Church of England church buildings in the City of Westminster
19th-century Church of England church buildings
Diocese of London
St John's Wood
Grade II* listed churches in the City of Westminster